Lesticus sulabayaensis is a species of ground beetle in the genus Lesticus, in the family Carabidae and the subfamily Pterostichinae. It was described by Kirschenhofer in 2003.

References

Lesticus
Beetles described in 2003